Mahamouda or Mahamouda Cherif is a village in the Bignona Department of the Ziguinchor Region of southwestern Senegal. In 2002 the village had a population of 459 people. It lies along the N5 road, which connects it directly to the town of Diouloulou in the northwest.

References

Populated places in the Bignona Department